The 1965 World Table Tennis Championships mixed doubles was the 28th edition of the mixed doubles championship.  

Koji Kimura and Masako Seki defeated Chuang Shih-lin and Lin Hui-ching in the final by three sets to two.

Results

See also
List of World Table Tennis Championships medalists

References

-
Mixed doubles table tennis